Ceroplesis aenescens is a species of beetle in the family Cerambycidae. It was described by Fairmaire in 1893. It is known from Ethiopia.

References

Endemic fauna of Ethiopia
aenescens
Beetles described in 1893